Rajan Sarma is a Tamil film and television serial director of the 1980s.

Works

Films
 Yaro Azaikkirarkal ennai
 Kaiyodu Kai
 Thondan

Serials
 Tharaiyil Irangkum Vimanangal
 Puntharil Kanavukal
 Innaleyde Aalkkar (Malayalam)
 Thamizhaga Isaimagangal
 Kaveri
 Valarppu Magal
 Vidiyal Varum
 Pennala Devadai
 Kadhugal
 Gayathiri Mandhiram

Music
 Sangeetha Mangal
 Ragarrock

Tele films
 Koll Alladhu Kollappadu
 Kollava Konjava
 Kadhal. Com

External links
 www.sarmacinema.com - The web portal of True Cinema Movement.
 www.cinemaexpress.com - Review of the Film 'Kaiyodu Kai'

Living people
1956 births
Tamil-language film directors
People from Viluppuram district
Indian television directors
20th-century Indian film directors
Film directors from Tamil Nadu